Triammatus chevrolati is a species of beetle in the family Cerambycidae. It was described by Francis Polkinghorne Pascoe in 1856. It is known from Borneo, the Malayan Peninsula and Sumatra.

References

Lamiini
Beetles described in 1856